Declaration may refer to:

Arts, entertainment, and media

Literature
 Declaration (book), a self-published electronic pamphlet by Michael Hardt and Antonio Negri
 The Declaration (novel), a 2008 children's novel by Gemma Malley

Music 
 Declaration (The Alarm album) (1984)
 Declaration (Bleeding Through album) (2008)
 Declaration (Steven Curtis Chapman album) (2001)
Déclaration, a 1973 album by Georges Moustaki
 The Declaration, a 2008 album by Ashanti
Declaration, a 2020 album by Red

Songs
"Declaration (This Is It)", a 2012 gospel song by Kirk Franklin
"Declaration", a song by Killswitch Engage from the album The End of Heartache, 2004
"Declaration", a song by Trivium from the album Ascendancy, 2005 
"Déclaration", a classical song by Leoncavallo
"The Declaration", a 1970 song by The 5th Dimension

Other arts, entertainment, and media
 Declaration (poker), a formal expression of intent to take some action in the card game poker
 Declaration, a newspaper published in Independence, Virginia

Other uses
 Declaration (computer programming), a specification of the identifier, type, and other aspects of language elements
 Declaration (cricket), statement by which the captain of a cricket team declares its innings closed
 Declaration (law), authoritative establishment of fact, with various uses in law

See also 
 Customs declaration
 Declaration of independence, an assertion of the independence of an aspiring state or states
 Declaration of mailing
 Declaration of war, a formal declaration indicating that a state of war exists between nations
 Declarative (disambiguation)
 Declare, a novel by Tim Powers
 Manifesto, a published declaration of principles and intentions of an individual, group or organization